Bert D. Chandler (March 19, 1869 – December 13, 1947) was an American jurist.

Chandler was born in Rollin Township, Michigan. He studied the law and was admitted to the Michigan bar in 1890. Chandler practiced law, in Hudson, Michigan. He also served as a judge of the 39th Circuit from 1914 to 1915.

In November 1936, Chandler, a Democrat, defeated incumbent Republican Harry S. Toy, for a seat on the Michigan Supreme Court, by a vote of 862,147 to 755,227. Chandler served on the court from 1937 to 1943 and was chief justice. He was president of the Post Gazette newspaper. Chandler died suddenly at his home in Hudson, Michigan.

Notes

1869 births
1947 deaths
People from Lenawee County, Michigan
Editors of Michigan newspapers
Michigan state court judges
Chief Justices of the Michigan Supreme Court
People from Hudson, Michigan
Justices of the Michigan Supreme Court